William Henry Francis Willmott (16 May 1895 – 2 May 1947) was an Australian politician who was a member of the Legislative Assembly of Western Australia from 1938 until his death, representing the seat of Sussex.

Willmott was born in Busselton, in Western Australia's South West region. His uncle, Francis Edward Sykes Willmott, and first cousin, Francis Drake Willmott, were both also members of parliament. As a boy, Willmott lived at the Cape Leeuwin Lighthouse for several years, where his father was the lighthouse keeper. He enlisted in the Australian Imperial Force in April 1916, and during the war served as a private with the 16th and 32nd Battalions. While fighting at Zonnebeke, Belgium, Willmott lost one of his legs. After the war's end, he returned to Busselton to farm, and also served on the board of a dairy company. Representing the Nationalist Party, Willmott was elected to parliament at the 1938 Sussex by-election, which had been caused by the death of the sitting member, Edmund Brockman (a brother-in-law of Willmott's uncle). During the election campaign, he drove his car into a tree, which sent him into a brief coma and resulted in a broken rib and a severe concussion. Willmott retained his seat at the 1939, 1943, and 1947 state elections. However, he died in office in May 1947 (aged 51), after an extended illness.

References

1895 births
1947 deaths
Australian amputees
Australian Army soldiers
Australian military personnel of World War I
Liberal Party of Australia members of the Parliament of Western Australia
Members of the Western Australian Legislative Assembly
Nationalist Party of Australia members of the Parliament of Western Australia
People from Busselton
20th-century Australian politicians